The Maliri were a people, recalled by various communities in Kenya and Uganda today, that inhabited regions on the north east of and north west borders of Uganda and Kenya respectively and later spread to regions in southern Ethiopia.

Origins
The Maliri are thought to have settled in what are now Jie country and large parts of Dodoth country in Uganda. Their arrival in the districts is estimated at 600 to 800 years ago (i.e c.1200 to 1400 AD)

Society

Occupation
The Maliri followed a pastoral way of life. It is unclear whether they practiced any form of cultivation.

Language
The Maliri spoke a Kalenjin language

Decline

Lwoo Incursions
Oral traditions indicate that the expansion of Lwoo speakers into Acholi caused the breakaway of a group who were initially known as Jie. The Jie came from the vicinity of Gulu though there was a section of the group who came from a hill known as Got Turkan. The Jie who are said to have been Luo speaking though governed by elders and not chiefs (indicating that their culture was not fully Lwoo-ised), advanced eastward and entered the present Karamoja boundary at Adilang. The territory they entered was then occupied by the Maliri who were pushed to the vicinity of Koten mountains.

The Jie from Got Turkan, now calling themselves Turkana, broke away from the main Jie populace at Kotido and advanced eastward bringing extreme pressure to bear on the Maliri at Koten causing that group to split into two. One section came to be known as Merille while the other referred to themselves as Pokotozek.

Fragmentation

Merille

The Merille who as late as 1970 were still known to the Karimojong as Maliri moved further eastward from their rest point at Koten, settling somewhere east of the Turkana escarpment. Here they again had encounters with the Turkana causing them to move further northward and eastward towards present day Lake Turkana where they settled at Lokitaung. Here again the Turkana harried them and pushed them into their present homeland and what may have been their original cradle-land in the Omo Valley in southern  Ethiopia.

Pokotozek

The Pokotozek moved south, arriving at Nakiloro which lies on the lip of the Turkana escarpment just north of Moroto mountain, where they stayed for a short while before moving further south, proceeding down the eastern side of the Chemorongit and Cherangani mountains before finally branching off in the direction of Lake Baringo.

This Pokot incursion disturbed Oropom who were settled around Baringo, causing a break-up of that group which led to migrations in various directions;

Turkwell, some Oropom moved towards the Turkwell, both below and above Turkwell gorge.

Uasin Gishu; other moved into Uasin Gishu Maasai held territory

Oropom; some moved to the Chemorongit mountains which were still part of Oropom territory, as well as the area west of there and south of Moroto mountain

The Pokotozek finding that they were no longer facing a formidable tribal grouping to the north and west of Baringo, themselves expanded in that direction, expelling other Oropom from the Cherangani mountains and further west right up to the slopes of Mt Elgon hence limiting Turkana southern movement.

Sebei
At Mt Elgon, a section of the Pokotozek formed into the people today known as the Sebei. On arriving at Mt Elgon, the Sebei-Pokotozek found Tepes people who were originally from Kadam mountain in Karamoja residing at a place later known as Entepes (today Endebess). These Tepes had already come under pressure from Oropom who were fleeing Pokotozek/Turkana incursions in such numbers that some Tepes were forced to return to Kadam.

It is notable that the emerging Sebei referred to the Mt Elgon Oropom as Sirikwa. The Sirikwa population at Mt Elgon, as evidenced by Sirkwa holes, was fairly dense and it is likely that their identity was still largely intact. It would take the Karimojong dispersion of the Oropom at Kapcheliba in the early 18th century to finally submerge the Oropom-Sirikwa identity.

Becoming Pokot
The Pokotozek defeated the Loikop at Baringo, following which a settlement was established at En-ginyang (about 48 kilometers north of Lake Baringo). This event signified the establishment of the pastoral Chok, i.e Pokot, community.

Pokot traditions recall that the victory came when "... there arose a wizard among the Suk who prepared a charm in the form of a stick, which he placed in the Loikop cattle kraals, with the result that they all died."

Once the Pokotozek breached the Loikop boundary thus gaining access to the Kerio valley, a desire arose many Chok to adopt pastoralist culture. The aim and ambition of every agricultural Chok became to amass enough cattle to move into the Kerio Valley and join their pastoral kin. They achieved this through attaining cattle as the bride-price of their female relations or through adoption, in the latter case, poor Chok youth would be adopted by members of the emerging Pokot community primarily as herds-boys.

By the early 20th century, the Pokot community was expanding as many of the Chok joined their rank and by that time, many Pokot who were termed Suk by the colonial administrators did not recognize this name for their tribe.

References

Ethnic groups in Kenya
Ethnic groups in Uganda